Geovani or Geovany or Geovanni or Giovane or Giovani or Giovanni, a form of the given name John, may refer to:

 Geovany Baca (born 1971), Honduran boxer
 Giovane Élber (born 1972), Brazilian footballer
 Geovani Faria da Silva (born 1964) Brazilian footballer
 Giovane Gávio (born 1970), Brazilian volleyball player
 Geovanni (born 1980), Brazilian footballer
 Giovani Luiz Neitzke (born 1989), Brazilian footballer
 Giovani dos Santos (born 1989), Mexican footballer
 Geovany Soto (born 1983), Puerto Rican baseballer
 Geovani (footballer, born 1993), Brazilian football midfielder
 Geovani (footballer, born 2001), Brazilian football midfielder

See also
 Giovanni (disambiguation)